The Hawaii Tropical Bioreserve and Garden (17 acres) is a nonprofit botanical garden and nature preserve located on the 4 mile scenic route off of Route 19 at 27-717 Old Māmalahoa Highway, Pāpa'ikou, Hawaii (island), Hawaii. It is open daily except Thanksgiving, Christmas, and New Year's Day.  An admission fee is charged to the general public.

The garden is located in a scenic valley opening out to Onomea Bay, and features streams, waterfalls and a boardwalk along the ocean. It was created by Dan J. Lutkenhouse, who purchased the property in 1977 and began to develop it as a botanical garden. It opened to the public in 1984, and was donated by the Lutkenhouses to a nonprofit trust in 1995.

Today the garden contains over 2,000 plant species, representing more than 125 families and 750 genera, with good collections of palms (nearly 200 species), heliconias (more than 80 species), and bromeliads (more than 80 species). Some of the garden's mango and coconut palm trees are over 100 years old.

The garden combines water and flora: A three-tiered waterfall (Onomea Falls) provides one of several water views which include Boulder Creek and the lava tubes on Onomea Bay.

Gallery

See also 
 List of botanical gardens in the United States

References

External links 

 Hawaii Tropical Botanical Garden

Botanical gardens in Hawaii
Waterfalls of Hawaii (island)
Protected areas of Hawaii (island)